Hadh Kar Di Aapne (transl. You have crossed the limits)  is a 2000 Indian Hindi-language comedy film directed by Manoj Agrawal. The film stars Govinda and Rani Mukerji.

Synopsis 
Rajveer aka Raju is a detective who is hired to help his friend Sanjay prove that his wife is having an extramarital affair so that he can divorce her. Sanjay's wife Anjali also suspects that her husband is cheating and hires her friend Anjali to seek proof of an extramarital relationship to facilitate an easy divorce. The couple has long been separated, each knowing that their spouse has moved to Europe with their boyfriend/girlfriend.

In Europe, detective Raju meets the other Anjali, and they fall in love but get into a fight later on, because Rajveer thinks that Anjali is already  married  with his friend Sanjay, which Anjali tries to explain to him that she is not married. Later Sanjay and Anjali come across each other and learn of their mistakes and started thinking about Rajveer and Anjali. On the other hand, both Raj and Anjali returned back from Europe tour and decided to go their own way as they still think that both are married. Raj returned back to his house whereas Anjali returned back to her house. Mr.Khanna and Mrs.Khanna parents of Anjali decided to marry their daughter off. There came Prakash Chaudhary and Bhaidas Bhai as caterer and tent decorator. They learn that Anjali is about to marry someone else but she loves Rajveer. So, they called Raj and asked him to come at Anjali's house. Finally, Anjali and Rajveer wed after many comical turnings at the wedding venue.

Cast 
 Govinda as Rajveer Malhotra / Father / Mother / Sister / Grandfather / Grandmother
 Rani Mukerji as Anjali Khanna
 Nirmal Pandey as Sanjay Khanna, Raj's friend
 Ritu Shivpuri as Anjali Khanna, Anjali's friend
 Satish Kaushik as Prakash Choudhury 
 Johnny Lever as Advocate Lever Jr. (son) / Advocate Lever Sr. (father) (dual role)
 Paresh Rawal as  Kailash Patel 
 Tinnu Anand as Mr. Khanna 
 Smita Jaykar as Mrs. Khanna
 Helen Brodie as  Mona
 Tannaz Irani as Mrs. Bhaidas 
 Rakesh Bedi as Chelaramani
 Bharat Kapoor as Mr. Sharma
 Avtar Gill as Mr. Bakhiyani
 Himani Shivpuri as Mrs. Bakhiyani
 Navneet Nishan as Mrs. Choudhury
 Viju Khote as Anjali's uncle

Soundtracks
The soundtracks of this movie has been composed by Anand Raj Anand. Songs like "Kudi Kanwaari Tere Piche", "Oye Raju Pyaar Na Kariyo" and "Hadh Kar Di Aapne" were famous during the release. Akhlaq Hussain of Planet Bollywood quoted about the album: "All in all, HADH KAR DI AAPNE is 'PAISA-VASOOL' (worth your money) for almost everyone as it has fast and slow numbers. It has all the ingredients of a good soundtrack, a good title track, a fine item number ("Kudi Kunwaari"), and a decent parody song, what more could somebody ask for in this day and age of fly-by-night songs, while lyrics by Anand Bakshi".

External links

References

2000s Hindi-language films
2000 films
T-Series (company) films
Films scored by Anand Raj Anand
Films scored by Surinder Sodhi